My Child Lebensborn is a 2018 social simulation game developed by Sarepta Studio and published by Teknopilot for iOS, Android, Windows, Nintendo Switch, PlayStation 4, and Xbox One. The player takes the role of parenting a lebensborn child in Norway after World War II and helps them to navigate growing up and bullying that they face because of their background. The game received praise for its portrayal of emotional trauma, but reviewers noted that the game could be tough to play through.

Gameplay
In My Child Lebensborn, the player plays as an adoptive parent of a lebensborn child in Norway after World War II. The player must make choices based on off-screen events (e.g. responding to child being bullied at school) and help to take care of them at home (e.g. making food for them). Each day, there are two units of time that the player can use to help to make sure the child's "need" meters do not empty. At the end of each chapter of the game, the player sees how their decisions fall on an emotional spectrum and how it has affected the player's child.

Development
While Elin Festøy was developing a documentary about the children of lebensborn, she decided instead to focus on a project that would elicit empathy for the children amongst a broader audience. She met developer Catharina Bøhler, a developer who was already creating a child nurturing game, and they created what Festøy called "a documentary game". Festøy was concerned that a documentary film would just be a movie about old people talking about war, and felt that a video game would work better to show the story of what the children had to go through. "We want to make people know what it felt like for those kids," Festøy said. "We want to highlight how war isn't over until the hatred ends. Our game will be a simulator letting you experience first hand what it is like to grow up in a hateful society, focused on the situation of the child instead of the greater conflict." The game was among the first wave of video game titles that were permitted to display the swastika in Germany. The game was funded partially by a Norwegian government arts grant, and partially through a successful Kickstarter campaign.

Reception
Reviewers commented that the game was not fun because of its dark story, but felt the game taught important lessons for players and was still an experience worth playing. Polygons Colin Campbell described Lebensborn as a "sort of bullying-management simulation" and praised the game for being an uncomfortable experience. Der Spiegels Matthias Kreienbrink called the game "not fun" but noted that it was a "partly depressing, partly enlightening" experience. The Guardians Simon Parkin felt that the game was "fierce and unflinching", and that although the game succeeded as a portrait of time in history, it was a "a difficult ride – oppressive, psychologically strenuous and repetitive." Pocket Gamers Emily Sowden felt that it was an educational experience that was worth it for the "price of a cup of coffee".

The game won a 2018 BAFTA Games Award from the British Academy of Film and Television Arts (BAFTA) at the 15th British Academy Games Awards on April 4, 2019, as a "Game beyond entertainment".

The Google Play store later blocked access to the game in Germany, Austria, Russia, and France because of the sensitive nature of its content, with a Google spokesperson saying "This game does not violate our sensitive content policies in most countries, but it does so in a few markets." Festøy said "We're working to get more information from Google and have only been told we’ve been removed due to controversial content."

References

External links
 My Child Lebensborn official website

2018 video games
Android (operating system) games
IOS games
Social simulation video games
Windows games
Video games about children
Video games developed in Norway
Video games set in Norway
Video games set in the 1950s
Nazism in fiction
British Academy Games Award for Game Beyond Entertainment winners